Chavannes may refer to:

In France
Chavannes, Cher, in the Cher department 
Chavannes, Drôme, in the Drôme department
Chavannes-les-Grands, in the Territoire de Belfort department 
Chavannes-sur-l'Étang, in the Haut-Rhin department
Chavannes-sur-Reyssouze, in the Ain department
Chavannes-sur-Suran, in the Ain department

In Switzerland
Chavannes-de-Bogis, in the canton of Vaud 
Chavannes-des-Bois, in the canton of Vaud
Chavannes-le-Chêne, in the canton of Vaud 
Chavannes-les-Forts, in the municipality of Siviriez, canton of Fribourg
Chavannes-le-Veyron, in the canton of Vaud 
Chavannes-près-Renens, in the canton of Vaud
Chavannes-sur-Moudon, in the canton of Vaud 
Chavannes, Berne, in the municipality of  La Neuveville, canton of Berne

Surname
Celina Caesar-Chavannes, Canadian politician
Édouard Chavannes, French sinologist
Fernand Henri Chavannes (1897-1985), French World War I flying ace
Jean-Baptiste Chavannes, Haitian revolutionary
Jean-Baptiste Chavannes (agronomist), Haitian agronomist
Marc Chavannes, Dutch professor for journalism
Charles de Chavannes, French colonial administrator and author
Pierre Puvis de Chavannes, French artist

See also
La Chavanne, Savoie, France